Kuttabul is a rural town and locality in the Mackay Region, Queensland, Australia.

Geography 
The town is located in the centre of the locality. The Bruce Highway crosses through the locality from the south-east to north-west, passing through the town. The North Coast railway line also crosses through the locality from the south-east to north-west running roughly parallel and to the east of the highway passing through the town. The town is served by the Kattabul railway station. The highway and railway pass through a low valley corridor (approx 40 metres above sea level) mostly used for growing sugarcane. To the west of the locality there are a number of mountains including Mount Martin (510 metres) within the Mount Martin National Park, while to the east of the locality there is The Pinnacle (570 metres) within the Pioneer Peaks National Park.

There are a number of neighbourhoods in the locality:

 Beallah
 Buthurra
 Geeberga
 Narpi

History 
The town takes its name from the Kuttabul railway station, which was assigned by the Queensland Railways Department on 5 March 1927. The name is an Aboriginal word meaning "wonderful".

Narpi State School opened on 23 August 1926. On 31 December 2005 the school was mothballed, being finally closed on 31 December 2006. It was at 69 Narpi Road.

References

External links 
 
 

Towns in Queensland
Mackay Region
Localities in Queensland